Massa may refer to:

Places
Massa, Tuscany, the administrative seat of the Italian province of Massa-Carrara.
Massa (river), river in Switzerland
 Massa (Tanzanian ward), administrative ward in the Mpwapwa district of the Dodoma Region of Tanzania
 Massa, Libya, a town in Libya
 Massa, Morocco, a town in Morocco
 Massah (מסה), place where the Israelites quarreled with God, according to the Torah
 Province of Massa and Carrara, province in the Tuscany region of Italy
 Souss-Massa, one of the twelve regions of Morocco
 Duchy of Massa and Carrara, controlled the towns of Massa di Carrara and Carrara
 Roman Catholic Diocese of Massa Marittima-Piombino was before 1978 called diocese of Massa Marittima
 Peyrusse-Massas, commune in the Gers department in southwestern France
 Castillon-Massas, commune in the Gers department in southwestern France
 Souss-Massa National Park, national park on the Atlantic coast of Morocco
 Hôtel de Massa, in the 14th arrondissement of Paris

Italian towns
 Massa d'Albe, province of L'Aquila
 Massa di Somma, province of Naples
 Massa e Cozzile, province of Pistoia
 Massa Fermana, province of Ascoli Piceno
 Massa Fiscaglia, province of Ferrara
 Massa Lombarda, province of Ravenna
 Massa Lubrense, province of Naples
 Massa Marittima, province of Grosseto
 Massa Martana, province of Perugia

Fictional locations
 Polis Massa, fictional planet from Star Wars

People
 Massa (surname)
 Massa (biblical figure), from Genesis
 Massa Makan Diabaté (1938–1988), Malian historian, author, and playwright
 Michael of Massa (Michael Beccucci de Massa) (died 1337), Italian Augustinian Hermit and theologian

Groups
 Ray Massa's EuroRhythms, Italian-American band from Columbus, Ohio

Animals
 Massa (gorilla), gorilla from the Philadelphia Zoo

Other uses
 Massa language, African language
 Portuguese sweet bread or Massa Sovada
 El Massa, Algerian daily newspaper Printed in Arabic
 Massa Marittima Cathedral, main church of Massa Marittima
 Massa–Senigallia Line, in the linguistics of the Romance languages
 Massa intermedia, the Interthalamic adhesion
 Massa, in early African American Vernacular English, see slave master
 Massa (song)

See also
 Masa (disambiguation)